Tomás Méndez (born Tomás Méndez Sosa; July 25, 1927 – June 19, 1995) was a Mexican composer and singer of Mexican music and ranchera music. He was born in Fresnillo, Zacatecas, Mexico. He obtained his first success in 1954 with the Mexican music song "Gorrioncillo pecho amarillo" and continued in the same year with the huapangos like "Cucurrucucú paloma" and "Desafío". He died in Mexico City on June 19, 1995.

The song "Cucurrucucú paloma" was played in many movie pictures like The Last Sunset, Happy Together, Talk to Her and The Five Year Engagement and has also been performed by notable singers such as Harry Belafonte, Perry Como, Lola Beltrán and Caetano Veloso.

Songs 
"Pobre Leña de Pirul"
"Gorrioncillo pecho amarillo"
"Cucurrucucú paloma"
"Golondrina presumida"
"Huapango torero"
"Las rejas no matan"
"Que me toquen las golondrinas"
"Paloma negra"
"Puñalada trapera"
"Tres días"
"La Muerte de Un Gallero"
"La Melina Que Se Fue"

External links 
 (Spanish)

1927 births
1995 deaths
People from Fresnillo
Mexican male composers
Ranchera singers
20th-century composers
20th-century Mexican male singers